The Shadow Heart is a Big Finish Productions audio drama based on the long-running British science fiction television series Doctor Who.

Plot
The Doctor returns to the fallen Drashani Empire, just as The Wrath look to conquer the Earth Empire. But he finds his own past coming back to haunt him in the worst possible way, as the galaxy's greatest bounty hunter is assigned with the task of hunting him down.

Cast
The Doctor – Sylvester McCoy
Vienna Salvatori – Chase Masterson  
Talbar – Eve Karpf
Talbar – Alex Mallinson 
Captain Webster / Starbaff / Wrath Emperor – John Banks 
Lt Dervish – Jaimi Barbakoff
Prince Kylo – James Wilby
Princess Aliona – Kirsty Besterman

Continuity
This is the last in a trilogy of stories, following the Fifth Doctor in The Burning Prince and the Sixth Doctor in The Acheron Pulse.
Five decades have passed since the Doctor's last visit.
A month before this story's release, Big Finish announced that Chase Masterson's character was being given her own  series called Vienna.

References

External links
The Shadow Heart

2012 audio plays
Seventh Doctor audio plays